Thing of the Past is the third studio album by Andy Cabic's San-Francisco-based band Vetiver.

The album consists of cover songs originally performed by songwriters Andy Cabic considers influential in his music & life. Several of the original authors appear as guests on their respective songs, including Michael Hurley. Thing of the Past was recorded in Spring 2007 in Sacramento and Los Angeles. The basic tracks, including all the guitars, drums, bass and some of the vocals, were recorded live in studio.

Cabic has professed pride in the record, remarking:
I think this is the best album I've yet to make, in no small part because the songs are so good, but also because I didn't write them, which offered me a useful combination of restraint and freedom in performing them, bringing out the best in myself and the other musicians. It was an experiment in a lot of ways, and it was one of the best experiences I've yet to have recording anything.

Rhapsody (online music service) praised the album, calling it one of their favorite cover albums.

Track listing
 "Houses" (Elyse Weinberg) – 3:43
 "Roll on Babe" (Derroll Adams) – 4:27
 "Sleep a Million Years" (Dia Joyce) – 2:54
 "Hook & Ladder" (Norman Greenbaum) – 3:10
 "To Baby" (Biff Rose) – 4:26
 "The Road to Ronderlin" (Ian Matthews) – 2:24
 "Lon Chaney" (Garland Jeffreys) – 4:21
 "Hurry on Sundown" (Dave Brock) – 6:29
 "The Swimming Song" (Loudon Wainwright III) – 2:41
 "Blue Driver" (Michael Hurley) - 3:55
 "Standin'" (Townes Van Zandt) – 3:39
 "I Must Be in a Good Place Now" (Bobby Charles) - 4:30

Musicians
Andy Cabic: Vocals, Guitar & Banjo
Brent Dunn: Bass
Sanders Trippe: Guitar & Vocals
Otto Hauser: Drums & Keyboards
Kevin Barker: Guitar, Vocals & Banjo
Vashti Bunyan: Vocals on "Sleep A Million Years"
Dave Scher: Keyboard, Pedal Steel & Melodica
Jason Quever: Piano
Michael Hurley: Vocals on "Blue Driver"
Ben Kunin: Sarod
Jonathan Wilson: Acoustic guitar
Emma Smith: Violin
Meara O'Reilly, Abigail Chapin & Lily Chapin: Background vocals

References

2008 albums
FatCat Records albums
Vetiver albums
Covers albums